The Association for Career and Technical Education (ACTE) is the largest national education association in the United States dedicated to the advancement of education that prepares for careers. The ACTE is committed to enhancing the job performance and satisfaction of its members; to increasing public awareness and appreciation for career and technical education (CTE); and to assuring growth in local, state and federal funding for these programs by communicating and working with legislators and government leaders.

About ACTE

The ACTE's membership is composed of more than 27,000 career and technical educators, administrators, researchers, guidance counselors and others involved in planning and conducting career and technical education programs at the secondary, postsecondary levels.  ACTE's leadership is a volunteer Board of Directors elected by the members of the Association in an annual election. Board officers include the president, president-elect and past-president. The ACTE produces publications, including issue briefs on topics such as improving student literacy skills in the context of learning hands-on skills.

Policy & Advocacy
One of ACTE’s most critical roles is representing the career and technical education field through advocacy activities, including direct lobbying, media relations and public awareness. This work promotes the value of CTE and the policies that are needed to support CTE practitioners, advance the field and improve student learning.

CareerTech VISION
ACTE hosts and participates in a wide range of events throughout the year. Chief among them is the Association's annual conference CareerTech VISION. CareerTech VISION is designed to be an integral component of an educators overall professional learning plan. The format of VISION has been created to meet individual professional growth needs and align with institutional strategic-improvement plans. Participants drill deeper and accomplish more by taking advantage of a wide range of international partnerships and powerful business and industry connections.

National Policy Seminar
The National Policy Seminar which is held every spring hosts over 400 career and technical educators, administrators and partners that come together to show their support for CTE on Capitol Hill.  Attendees learn about federal policy priorities and upcoming legislative activities, and to help policymakers make the connection that CTE is the answer to many of the key challenges facing our country, including dropout rates, postsecondary access and completion, the skills gap, unemployment and more.

References

External links
 Association for Career and Technical Education Official Site
 Website for ACTE's VISION Conference

Vocational education in the United States
Educational organizations based in the United States